Wojciech Kasperski (born April 25, 1981) is a Polish screenwriter, film director and producer. In 2006 he received the Grand Prix for The Seeds for Best Documentary at Kraków Film Festival, and went on to win several prestigious awards including Sterling Short Grand Jury Award at AFI-Discovery Channel Silverdocs Documentary Festival. His short films won over forty awards and recognitions around the world and garnered extensive media attention and critical acclaim. Winner of Golden Laurel, Russian Film Academy Award for Best Short Documentary.

Biography 
He was born in Kartuzy and moved with his family to Sopot a seaside town on the coast of the Baltic Sea. In 2001–2002, he studied philosophy at the University of Gdańsk, but subsequently gave it up, and studied at the National Film School in Łódź. He started working as a documentary filmmaker in far Siberia, visiting small villages and secluded societies. He began his career in 2006 with the short documentary The Seeds, followed by two other documentaries shot in Russia.

Career
He worked with many prominent Polish actors on his fiction short films. His The Refuge City was shown in main competition at Tribeca Film Festival, San Francisco Shorts, Next Reel in Singapur and Rhode Island International Film Festival among many others. He also worked at a theatre and directed János Háy’s performance Child Geza. He ran drama workshops at Studyjny Theatre. He has been working as a writer and screenwriter since 2008. Since 2009 he has run an independent production company, that has its place among Polish production houses focused on young filmmakers.

Kasperski is a Ministry of Culture "Młoda Polska Scholarship" holder for most talented young Polish artists. Since 2008 he has been an expert for the Ministry of Culture, evaluating film projects for financing by the Polish Film Institute. He was chosen by the European Film Academy to take part in annual Sunday in the country meetings. Polish newsmagazine Przekrój called him one of the most promising young Polish directors of his generation in article "20 Hopes of polish cinema".

Filmography

Short Movies 
 The Refuge City – short fiction 2006
 Przestrzeń – short fiction 2003
 Kasety - short fiction 2003

Short Documentaries 
 Chasm – short documentary 2009
 The Seeds – short documentary 2006

Other Works 
 Serce do Walki – short fiction 2011 (executive producer)
 Z Miłości – film fabularny 2011 (producer)
 Przyjdź do mnie – short fiction 2009 (executive producer)
 Midway Through the Journey - short fiction 2007 (assistant director)
 A Song for Rebecca – short fiction 2005 (assistant director)

Awards (selection) 
The Refuge City 

Polish Independent Film Awards - 2007 Best Director
 International Independent Feature Film Festiwal in Warsaw - 2007 1st prize
 Media School International Film Festival - 2006 Special Prize
International Student Film Festival of Beijing Film Academy - 2006 Audience Award
 International Film Festival Era New Horizons - 2007 Special Commendation
 Etiuda & Anima International Film Festival Cracow - 2006 Audience Award
 Sopot Film Festival - 2006 Special Commendation
 The Sleepwalkers Student Film Festival in Tallinn - 2006 Grand Prix
 Łodzią Po Wiśle - 2006 1st prize
 International Film Festival ZOOM, Jelenia Góra - 2007 Grand Prix
 Krakffa Film Festival - 2007 1st prize
 Independent Movie Festival KAN - 2007 Silver Cane

The Seeds  
 L'Alternativa Festival de cinema independent de Barcelona - 2006 Special commendation
 Prix Europa Berlin - 2006 Nomination for Prix Europa and Special Commendation for documentary
 Festival International de cine documental de la Ciudad de Mexico - 2007 Special Jury Prize
 Kraków Film Festival - 2006 Grand Prix, Golden Hobby Horse
 Kraków Film Festival - 2006 Kodak Award
 Kraków Film Festival - 2006 Cracow Student Jury Award, Because  we like it when the film avoids persuasion and the lives of the protagonists seem more intriguing than our own. It is with words small like seeds that you speak about a grand film. For the truth, the atmosphere and the shivers
 Moscow Festival - 2006 Golden Laurel, Best Artistic Film
 Media Festival Łódź - 2007 Special Jury Prize
 Perm Documentary Film Festival - 2006  Great Silver Nanook, Best documentary
 The CMU International Film Festival, Pittsburg - 2006 Grand Prix, International Short Film
 European Film Week ON/OFF Warsaw - 2006 Special Jury Prize
 AFI Discovery Channel Documentary Film Festival Silverdocs - 2006 Grand Prix, Short Documentary
 Big Sky Documentary Film Festival, Montana - 2007 Special Jury Prize If Chekov and Rembrandt had collaborated on documentary film, it might have the visual richness and dramatic insight of Seeds

Official Screenings (selection) 
 Cannes Film Festival - 2007 screening, Tous Les Cinémas du Monde
 INPUT Conference, Taipei - 2006 screening
 Tribeca Film Festival, New York - 2008 competition
 Beverly Hills Film Festival, Los Angeles - 2006 competition
 Dok Leipzig - 2007 competition

See also
Cinema of Poland
National Film School in Łódź
List of Polish language films

References

External links

 http://www.wojciechkasperski.com - official home page
 Information about director at Polish Cultural Institute New York
Director profile at Ann Arbour Polish Film Festival

1981 births
Living people
People from Kartuzy
Łódź Film School alumni
Polish screenwriters
Polish film directors
Media Wave Award winners